The 2018–19 season was Blackpool F.C.'s 110th season in the Football League, and their second consecutive season in the third tier of the Football League. They finished the season in tenth place. Along with competing in League One, the club also participated in the FA Cup (eliminated in the third round), League Cup (eliminated in the fourth round) and Football League Trophy (eliminated at the group stage).

The season covered the period from 1 July 2018 to 30 June 2019.

Gary Bowyer, manager of the club since 2016, resigned on 6 August. He was succeeded by Terry McPhillips on 10 September.

Blackpool's top scorer in all competitions was Armand Gnanduillet.

First-team squad

Statistics

|-
|-
!colspan=14|Players who left the club during the season:

 
|}

Goals record

Disciplinary record

Transfers

Transfers in

Transfers out

Loans in

Loans out

Competitions

Friendlies
Blackpool announced pre-season friendlies with Nantwich Town, Port Vale, AFC Fylde and Crewe Alexandra.

EFL League One

League table

Results summary

Results by matchday

Matches
On 21 June 2018, the League Two fixtures for the forthcoming season were announced.

FA Cup

The first round draw was made live on BBC by Dennis Wise and Dion Dublin on 22 October. The draw for the second round was made live on BBC and BT by Mark Schwarzer and Glenn Murray on 12 November. The third round draw was made live on BBC by Ruud Gullit and Paul Ince from Stamford Bridge on 3 December 2018.

EFL Cup

On 15 June 2018, the draw for the first round was made in Vietnam. The second round draw was made from the Stadium of Light on 16 August. The third round draw was made on 30 August 2018 by David Seaman and Joleon Lescott. The fourth round draw was made live on Quest by Rachel Yankey and Rachel Riley on 29 September.

EFL Trophy
On 13 July 2018, the initial group stage draw bar the U21 invited clubs was announced.

Summary

References

Blackpool F.C. seasons
Blackpool F.C.